Chloride Electrical Storage Company was a British company that manufactures and sells storage batteries. The company has approximately 35 subsidiary companies in the UK, several being dormant, most are wholly owned and some 22 subsidiary and associated companies in overseas countries.

Early history
The company was originally registered as Chloride Electrical Storage Syndicate on 12 December 1891. It was formed in a deal between the Electric Storage Battery Company (E.S.B. Co.) of New Jersey, and the United Gas Improvement Company based in Pennsylvania and John A. E. Hickson to expand outside the USA using patents and "applications" assigned by the parent companies. It was reconstituted as the Chloride Electrical Storage Company in 1902.

Products
Until 1914–1918 most of the demand was for large stationary batteries used in early generating stations and for domestic lighting installations. New and growing demand came for batteries on submarines, and after the First World War, the company's batteries were in growing demand for use in train lighting, motor vehicles and as accumulators for valve radio receiving sets.

Acquisitions
The company made acquisitions of alkaline battery and lead-acid battery manufacturing companies and became a supplier of automotive and traction batteries.

The company acquired two of its moulded battery casings suppliers, Lorival in 1927 and United Ebonite Manufacturers in 1934, merging them in 1939, to form a new subsidiary United Ebonite & Lorival Ltd.

Customers
The company supplied Indian Railways, Ford, Rolls-Royce and Vauxhall. Demand increased during the Second World War.

References

External links
 http://www.gracesguide.co.uk/Chloride_Electrical_Storage_Co

Battery manufacturers
Manufacturing companies of the United Kingdom
Manufacturing companies established in 1891
British companies established in 1891
Companies based in Manchester